Keith Barry, known professionally as Tree, is an American musician and multi-instrumentalist. He is best known as a past touring member of the Red Hot Chili Peppers, and for having appeared on several albums released by the band. He is also a member of the funk band Mandrill. He has collaborated with groups including Gov't Mule and Thelonious Monster, as well as with jazz artists Harry Edison, Les McCann, and Leroy Vinnegar. Tree is the co-founder and dean of the Silverlake Conservatory of Music.

Biography
Keith Barry was born in New York City, then moved to Los Angeles in 1977 at the age of 13. In junior high, he met Flea, and the two remained friends throughout junior high and high school. He started using the name Tree during a ski trip with Flea and Anthony Kiedis. He later attended the Berklee College of Music in 1980.

Tree returned to Los Angeles after college. He was around for the formation of the Red Hot Chili Peppers by his old classmates, and claims he came up with the band's name. He is credited with playing viola and arranging horns on their first album, The Red Hot Chili Peppers. Tree returned to the band in 1989, playing tenor saxophone on the album Mother's Milk. He also performed on the Mother's Milk Tour. Tree played saxophone on the I'm with You World Tour, his first performance with the Red Hot Chili Peppers in 21 years.

In 2001, Flea and Tree co founded the Silverlake Conservatory of Music, where Tree currently serves as the Conservatory's dean.

Partial discography

Solo
Blew Year's Proposition (1995 album)

Collaborations
The Red Hot Chili Peppers (1984 album), selected tracks
Baby...You're Bummin' My Life out in a Supreme Fashion (1986 album), selected tracks
Next Saturday Afternoon (1987 album), selected tracks
Stormy Weather, (1989 album), selected tracks
Mother's Milk (1989 album), tracks 3 and 12
One Hot Minute (1995 album), track 9
The Deep End, Volume 1 (2001 album), track 4
Helen Burns (2012 EP), track 6

References

1964 births
Fairfax High School (Los Angeles) alumni
American alternative rock musicians
American experimental musicians
20th-century American musicians
21st-century American musicians
Living people